CCO or cco may refer to:

Organizational positions

 Chief channel officer, the executive responsible for indirect revenue with a partner within an organization
 Chief commercial officer, the executive responsible for commercial strategy and development
 Chief communications officer, or sometimes, Corporate communications officer, the executive responsible for communications, public relations or public affairs or both
 Chief compliance officer, the executive responsible for compliance with regulatory requirements
 Chief content officer, the executive responsible for content in broadcasting
 Chief creative officer, the executive responsible for the creative team of a company
 Chief customer officer, the executive responsible for the total relationship with customers
 Chief culture officer, the executive position responsible for cultural alignment of a company, described in a 2009 book by Grant McCracken
 Civilian Communications Officer, a position in the Central Communications Command of London's Metropolitan Police Service
 Call centre, operator

Organizations 
 Cancer Care Ontario, the provincial agency responsible for improvement of cancer services in Ontario, Canada
 Catholic Christian Outreach, a Catholic campus ministry organization in Canadian universities
 Cayuga Chamber Orchestra, an orchestra based in Ithaca, New York
 Center for Contemporary Opera, an opera company based in New York City
 Chandigarh Comets, a hockey team in Chandigarh, India
 City Centre Offices, an English/German record label for electronic music
 Clear Channel Outdoor, an international outdoor advertising corporation
 Coalition for Christian Outreach, a Christian campus ministry organization in American colleges
 Coordinated Care Organization, a network created by the state of Oregon to integrate healthcare services and contain cost increases through improved quality of care
 Council-controlled organisation, a local government trading organization in New Zealand
 Royal Canadian College of Organists (formerly the Canadian College of Organists)

Other 
 Canadian Computing Olympiad
 Combined cardiac output
 Constitutive role of communication in organizations, a theory describing the interaction of members of an organization
 Newnan–Coweta County Airport in Coweta County, Georgia
 Carolina, Clinchfield and Ohio Railway, owned by Clinchfield Railroad
 Cataloging Cultural Objects, a metadata standard developed by the Visual Resources Association
 Conservative Central Office, now the Conservative Campaign Headquarters of the British Conservative Party
 cco, the ISO 639-3 code for the Comaltepec Chinantec language
 M68 Close Combat Optic, referring to the Aimpoint CompM2 or its later version the Aimpoint CompM4

See also 
 C2O, or dicarbon monoxide
 CC0 (the '0' is a zero), a Creative Commons tool for releasing material into the public domain
 Shishio Makoto, a character in the Rurouni Kenshin anime